Brian Altman (born 1988) is an American professional poker player from Longmeadow, Massachusetts. He has won three titles on the World Poker Tour (WPT).

Poker career

Altman earned a doctorate in 2012 from the Albany College of Pharmacy and Health Sciences in Albany, New York. He began playing poker with his friends in high school after watching Chris Moneymaker win the 2003 World Series of Poker Main Event, and moved to Montreal, Quebec after college to play online poker full-time.

Altman's first WPT title came at the Lucky Hearts Poker Open in February 2015, where he outlasted a field of 1,027 and earned $723,000. In January 2020, he won the tournament again, this time against a field of 843. He became the first player in WPT history to win the same event twice. Altman won his third title at the Seminole Hard Rock Tampa in June 2021 against a field of 1,165, becoming the seventh player to win three WPT titles. He has made another three final tables, including two third-place finishes. His 27 career cashes are tied for seventh-most as of 2021.

With one win, three final tables, and $1,011,000 in earnings, Altman was named WPT Player of the Year for season 18.

At the WSOP, Altman has 30 career cashes and finished third in a WSOP Online event in 2020. He finished 113th in the Main Event in 2018, eliminating Phil Ivey on Day 4 after calling an all-in with top two pair.

Altman also made the final table of the PokerStars Caribbean Adventure in 2019, finishing in sixth place for $297,000.

As of 2021, Altman's career live tournament winnings exceed $5.3 million.

World Poker Tour titles

References

External links
Hendon Mob profile
WPT profile
WSOP.com profile

1988 births
American poker players
World Poker Tour winners
People from Longmeadow, Massachusetts
Living people